Richard Cory Kostelanetz (born May 14, 1940) is an American artist, author, and critic.

Birth and Education
Kostelanetz was born to Boris Kostelanetz and Ethel Cory and is the nephew of the conductor Andre Kostelanetz. He has a B.A. (1962) from Brown University and an M.A. (1966) in American History from Columbia University under Woodrow Wilson, NYS Regents, and International Fellowships; he also studied at King's College London as a Fulbright Scholar during 1964-1965.

He is the recipient of grants from the Guggenheim Foundation (1967), Pulitzer Foundation (1965), the DAAD Berliner Kunstlerprogramm (1981–1983), Vogelstein Foundation (1980), Fund for Investigative Journalism (1981), Pollock-Krasner Foundation (2001), CCLM (1981), ASCAP (1983 annually to the present), American Public Radio Program Fund (1984), and the National Endowment for the Arts with ten individual awards (1976, 1978, 1979, 1981, 1982, 1983, 1985, 1986, 1990, 1991). He also assumed production residencies at the Electronic Music Studio of Stockholm, Experimental TV Center (Owego, NY), Mishkenot Sha'ananim (Jerusalem), and the MIT Media Lab.

Works
Kostelanetz came onto the literary scene with essays in quarterlies such as Partisan Review and The Hudson Review, then profiles of older artists, musicians and writers for The New York Times Magazine; these profiles were collected in Master Minds" (1969)'.

His book The End of Intelligent Writing: Literary Politics in America (1974) caused considerable controversy. SoHo: The Rise and Fall of an Artists' Colony (2003) chronicles cultural life in New York City in the late 20th century. In 1967, he signed the "Writers and Editors War Tax Protest," vowing to refuse to pay taxes raised to fund the Vietnam War.

Books of his radically alternative fiction include In the Beginning (1971) (the alphabet arranged in single and double letter combinations), Short Fictions (1974), More Short Fictions (1980, and Furtherest Fictions (2007)); of his mostly visual poetry, Visual Language (1970), I Articulations (1974), Wordworks (1993), and More Wordworks (2006).

Among the anthologies he has edited are On Contemporary Literature (1964, 1969), Beyond Left & Right (1968), John Cage (1970, 1991), Moholy-Nagy (1970), Breakthrough Fictioneers (1973), Scenarios (1980), and The Literature of SoHo (1981).

A political anarchist-libertarian, he authored Political Essays (1999) and Toward Secession: More Political Essays (2008) and has since 1987 been a contributing editor for Liberty. In 1973 he was one of the signers of the Humanist Manifesto II''.

Media
Among his literary contemporaries, Richard Kostelanetz has also produced literature in audio, video, holography, prints, book-art, computer-based installations, among other new media. Though he coined the term "polyartist" to characterize people who excel at two or more nonadjacent arts, he considers that, since nearly all his creative work incorporates language or literary forms, it represents Writing reflecting polyartistry. "Wordsand" (1978–81) was a traveling early retrospective of his work in several media.

Bibliography

Reviews

His work has been acknowledged at some length(s) in the following and additional works:
 Ronald S. Berman's "America in the Sixties" (1967)
 Ihab Hassan's "Contemporary American Literature" (1973)
 Robert Spiller's "Literary History of the United States" (fourth ed., 1974)
 "The Reader's Adviser" (1969 & 1974)
 Daniel Hoffman's "Harvard Guide to Contemporary American Writing" (1979)
 Irving and Anne D. Weiss's "Thesaurus of Book Digests" 1950–1980 (1981)
 George Myers' "Introduction to Modern Times" (1982)
 David Cope's "New Directions in Music" (1984)
 Joan Lyons' "Artists' Books" (1985)
 Tom Holmes' "Electronic and Experimental Music" (1985)
 Jamake Highwater's "Shadow Show" (1986)
 "Columbia Literary History of the United States" (1988)
 Eric Salzman's "Twentieth-Century Music: An Introduction" (third edition, 1988)
 Tom Johnson's "The Voice of the New Music" (1989)
 Robert Siegle's "Suburban Ambush" (1989)
 John Rodden's "The Politics of Literary Reputation" (1989)
 "The Reader's Catalog" (1989)
 Lydia Goehr's "The Imaginary Museum of Musical Works" (1992)
 Bob Grumman's "Of Manywhere-at-Once" (1998)
 Samuel R. Delany's "About Writing" (2005)
 Kyle Gann's "Music Downtown" (2006)
 Sally Banes's "Before, Between, and Beyond: Three Decades of Dance Writing" (2007, University of Wisconsin Press)
 C. T. Funkhouser's "Prehistoric Digital Poetry" (2007)
 Geza Perneczky's "Assembling Magazines 1969–2000" (2007)

References

External links

 Britannica Online Encyclopedia – Richard Kostelanetz
 The Fales Library Guide to the Richard Kostelanetz Papers
 RichardKostelanetz.com
 Pulley Press: Richard Kostelanetz
 Richard Kostelanetz Bibliography
 Deep Listening Catalogue: Richard Kostelanetz
 Poem by Richard Kostelanetz in Shampoo Issue 14
 Collected Stories – A Word with the Writer Richard Kostelanetz by D. Albanese (2001)
 Richard Kostelanetz: experimental prose – Epiphanies
 Microstories by Richard Kostelanetz in Gander Press Review
 Openings and (Complete) Shorter Stories by Richard Kostelanetz in The Cafe Irreal
 Invocations Album Details at Smithsonian Folkways
  Richard Kostelanetz, "1001 Film Scenarios – Selections from a Proposed Chapbook," Script 1.2 (January 2010) (June 3, 2010)

1940 births
Living people
American art critics
American libertarians
American people of Russian-Jewish descent
American tax resisters
Columbia Graduate School of Arts and Sciences alumni
Alumni of King's College London
Brown University alumni
Signalism
Scarsdale High School alumni
Visual poets